Bernd Landvoigt (born 23 March 1951) is a retired German rower.

Landvoigt and his twin brother Jörg were born in Brandenburg an der Havel, then in the German Democratic Republic.   Their father was a boatman:  their mother worked as a secretary.

Bernd Landvoigt had his best achievements in the coxless pairs, rowing with his twin Jörg. Between 1974 and 1980 they won all but one 180 races they competed in, including four world championships and two Olympics; they only lost once, to other twins, Yuri and Nikolay Pimenov. Landvoigt brothers also won a bronze medal in the eights at the 1972 Olympics and a European title in coxless fours in 1973.

After retiring from competitions Bernd Landvoigt worked as a rowing coach, first at his club SG Dynamo Potsdam and later with the national team. His wife Viola Goretzki and nephew Ike Landvoigt are also retired Olympic rowers.

References

External links
 
 

1951 births
Living people
Sportspeople from Brandenburg an der Havel
East German male rowers
Olympic rowers of East Germany
Rowers at the 1972 Summer Olympics
Rowers at the 1976 Summer Olympics
Rowers at the 1980 Summer Olympics
Olympic gold medalists for East Germany
Olympic bronze medalists for East Germany
Olympic medalists in rowing
World Rowing Championships medalists for East Germany
Medalists at the 1980 Summer Olympics
Medalists at the 1976 Summer Olympics
Medalists at the 1972 Summer Olympics
Recipients of the Patriotic Order of Merit in gold
Recipients of the Banner of Labor